David J Odwell (born 20 November 1952) is a British boxer. He competed in the men's middleweight event at the 1976 Summer Olympics.

Odwell won the 1974 and 1975 Amateur Boxing Association British middleweight title, when boxing out of the Repton ABC.

References

External links
 

1952 births
Living people
British male boxers
Olympic boxers of Great Britain
Boxers at the 1976 Summer Olympics
Boxers from Greater London
Middleweight boxers